Helen Kearney (born 6 June 1989) is an Irish Paralympic equestrian. She won three medals in the 2012 Summer Paralympics and also competed in the 2016 Summer Paralympics.

Early life and education
Kearney was born on 6 June 1989 in Wicklow, Ireland. She was educated at Newbridge College. When she was 10 years old, her parents enrolled her and her sister in horse riding lessons. Two years later, she was diagnosed with Friedreich's ataxia during an operation for scoliosis.

Career
Kearney began competed in Grade III in 2008 before being reclassified as 1A. In this classification, she won Ireland’s first European para-equestrian medal with a bronze. Kearney subsequently became the first member of Para Equestrian Ireland to earn a medal in the 2011 European Championships.

As a student at the University College Dublin, she qualified for the 2012 Summer Paralympics and earned three medals. Kearney earned a silver medal in the Individual championship test grade Ia and a Bronze Medal in the team event. Her last medal came in the Individual freestyle test grade Ia where she won bronze. 

In 2016, Kearney was again selected to compete with Team Ireland at the 2016 Summer Paralympics. During the Grade 1a Individual Championship, she finished in 12th place.

References

1989 births
Living people
Paralympic silver medalists for Ireland
Paralympic bronze medalists for Ireland
Equestrians at the 2012 Summer Paralympics
Equestrians at the 2016 Summer Paralympics
Medalists at the 2012 Summer Paralympics
Paralympic medalists in equestrian
Alumni of University College Dublin